Mopsitta tanta is an extinct bird of uncertain taxonomic position from the Early Eocene of Denmark; its remains were recovered from the Fur Formation. So far, the holotype and only known specimen is a single humerus bone of rather large size. Although the phylogenetic position of genus is unclear, it was initially presumed to be phylogenetically closer to Recent Psittacidae than to other known Palaeogene psittaciforms and may, therefore, represent the oldest known crown-group parrot.

However, further examination subsequently pointed out that the fossil lacks clear psittaciform (let alone psittacid) apomorphies. Following the discovery that the fossil ibis genus Rhynchaeites also occurred in the Fur Formation, it was hypothesized that the "M. tanta" humerus actually belongs in that genus, being a better match (except in size) to the known Rhynchaeites remains than to any psittaciform fossil hitherto found.

The new species has been nicknamed the Danish Blue Parrot in honor of the Monty Python “dead parrot” skit where Michael Palin claimed that a newly purchased “Norwegian Blue Parrot” was not “bleedin’ demised” as his disgruntled customer asserted, but was simply “shagged out following a prolonged squawk.”

References
https://grrlscientist.medium.com/monty-pythons-dead-parrot-discovered-efbdb2a8ff47

Prehistoric birds of Europe
Eocene birds
Prehistoric bird genera
Fur Formation
Extinct monotypic bird genera